Galla (fl. about 325) was a member of the Constantinian dynasty that ruled in the Roman Empire.

Biography 

Galla was the sister of the consul Neratius Cerealis and of the praetorian prefect Vulcacius Rufinus.

She married Julius Constantius, son of Constantius Chlorus and half-brother of Emperor Constantine I. From their union a son was born, who died with his father in the purges of 337, a daughter who married his cousin Constantius II, and finally Constantius Gallus, later Caesar of the East, born around 325. It has been proposed that Galla and Julius had another daughter, born between 324 and 331 and married to Justus, father of Justina (wife of emperor Valentinian I), whose daughter (wife of emperor Theodosius I) was called Galla.

Galla died before her husband, as Gallus was then entrusted to the care of Eusebius, bishop of Nicomedia.

Notes

Bibliography 
 Jones, Arnold Hugh Martin, John Robert Martindale, John Morris, "Galla 1", The Prosopography of the Later Roman Empire, Cambridge University Press, 1992, p. 382.

4th-century Roman women
Constantinian dynasty
Year of death unknown
Year of birth unknown
4th-century deaths
Neratii